The Mchogoro is a traditional Mahorese dance, that is notably celebrated during weddings.

Description

See also 
 Culture of Mayotte
 List of dances

References 

African dances
Mahoran culture
Wedding traditions